The National Transport Workers' Federation (NTWF) was an association of British trade unions. It was formed in 1910 to co-ordinate the activities of various organisations catering for dockers, seamen, tramwaymen and road transport workers.

History
The NTWF had some success as an organisational tool and as a symbol of trade union unity, but since its member unions retained full control over their own affairs it was not always able to have a direct influence on trade disputes. One of its members William Ball, was  the subject of a pamphlet 'Torture in an English Prison' about his treatment as a male union supporter of women's right to vote in 1911. In 1912, it called a National Dock Strike in support of London dockers which was observed only in a few centres, and which ended within a week. This was regarded as an embarrassing setback, and led the Federation to adopt a more cautious approach in subsequent years. In 1921 it was criticised for failing to bring out its members in support of the miners in the Black Friday crisis.

The NTWF laid the foundations for the creation of the Transport and General Workers Union (TGWU) in 1922.  The TGWU initially affiliated, but left in 1923, and the federation accomplished little thereafter, dissolving in 1927.

Affiliates
In 1918, the federation's affiliates were:

 Amalgamated Association of Carters and Motormen
 Amalgamated Association of Tramway and Vehicle Workers
 Amalgamated Carters', Lurrymen's and Motormen's Union
 Amalgamated Protective Union of Engine Drivers, Crane Drivers, Hydraulic and Boiler Attendants
 Amalgamated Society of Watermen, Lightermen and Bargemen
 Amalgamated Stevedores' Labour Protection League
 Cardiff, Penarth and Barry Coal Trimmers' Union
 Dock, Wharf, Riverside and General Workers' Union
 Glasgow Ship Riggers' Protective Association
 Hull Seamen's Union
 Labour Protection League
 London and Provincial Union of Licensed Vehicle Workers
 Liverpool and District Carters' and Motormen's Union
 Mersey River and Canal Watermen's Association
 National Amalgamated Labourers' Union
 National Amalgamated Union of Enginemen, Firemen, Mechanics, Motormen and Electrical Workers
 National Amalgamated Union of Labour
 National Seamen's and Firemen's Union
 National Union of Dock Labourers
 National Union of General Workers
 National Union of Ship's Stewards, Cooks, Butchers and Bakers
 National Union of Vehicle Workers
 National Warehouse and General Workers' Union
 Northwich Amalgamated Society of Salt Workers, Rock Salt Miners, Alkali Workers, Mechanics and General Labourers
 Scottish Horse and Motormen's Association
 Scottish Union of Dock Labourers
 United Carters' and Motormen's Association
 United Order of General Labourers
 United Society of Boiler Scalers
 Weaver Watermen's Association

Leadership

Presidents
1910: Harry Gosling
1924:

Secretaries
1910: James Anderson
1912: Robert Williams
1925: Frederick James Maynard

References

Defunct trade unions of the United Kingdom
1910 establishments in the United Kingdom
Trade unions established in 1910
Transport and General Workers' Union
1927 disestablishments in the United Kingdom
Defunct transport organisations based in the United Kingdom